Otto Satzinger (21 July 1878 – 6 May 1945) was an Austrian diver who won a bronze medal at the 1906 Intercalated Games in the platform event.

Satzinger represented Austria at the 1906 Intercalated Games in Athens, he competed in the platform diving event, where he and 23 other divers from six other countries had nine dives from three different heights, the five judges gave Satzinger 147.4 points and so finished third behind the two Germans Gottlob Walz and Georg Hoffmann.

Satzinger won the Austrian National Diving Championship at least seven times.

References

1878 births
1945 deaths
Divers at the 1906 Intercalated Games
Medalists at the 1906 Intercalated Games
Austrian male divers
Divers from Vienna
Sportspeople from the Austro-Hungarian Empire